The third season of The Real Housewives of New York City, an American reality television series, is broadcast on Bravo. It aired March 4, 2010 until June 24, 2010, and is primarily filmed in New York City, New York. Its executive producers are Andrew Hoegl, Barrie Bernstein, Lisa Shannon, Pam Healy and Andy Cohen.

The Real Housewives of New York City focuses on the lives of Bethenny Frankel, LuAnn de Lesseps, Alex McCord, Ramona Singer, Jill Zarin, Kelly Killoren Bensimon and Sonja Morgan. It consists of 18 episodes.

This season marked the first departure of original housewife Bethenny Frankel. She eventually returned for the show's 7th season.

Production and crew
The Real Housewives of New York was a continued success for the network with season two averaging 1.88 million total viewers as well as being Bravo's most visited web page in 2009 with over 46 million total page views. In July 2009, the series was renewed for a third season with production beginning November later that year. The premiere date for season three of The Real Housewives of New York City was revealed in January 2010 and the cast the following month.

The season premiere "New Alliances" was aired on March 4, 2010, while the fourteenth episode "Rebuked, Reunited, Renewed" served as the season finale, and was aired on June 3, 2010.
It was followed by a three-part reunion that aired on June 10, June 14 and June 14, 2010 and a "Lost Footage" episode on June 24, 2010, which marked the conclusion of the season. Andrew Hoegl, Barrie Bernstein, Lisa Shannon, Pam Healy and Andy Cohen are recognized as the series' executive producers; it is produced by Ricochet and is distributed by Shed Media.

After the airing of the first part of the reunion on June 10, 2010, The first spin-off to The Real Housewives of New York City season three, titled Bethenny Getting Married?, premiered on Bravo, starring Frankel, Jason Hoppy and Julie Plake. The series documented Frankel as she prepares her life for two of life's biggest milestones: a wedding and a baby, simultaneously. Frankel prepares for motherhood and marries Hoppy, while maintaining her career as an author and natural foods chef with the help of her assistant, Plake. The series premiere was marked as the highest viewing figure in the network's history but was later surpassed by Married to Medicine in March 2013. Upon the series renewal, it was re-titled to Bethenny Ever After.

Cast and synopsis
All six wives from the second season returned for the third installment. Season three introduced Sonja Morgan as a full-time cast member in the seventh episode "New Girl, Old Money" that aired on April 5, 2010. Morgan is a former model and friend to European royalty and is described as an "optimistic, free-spirited partygirl" Morgan revealed she has been asked to join the series prior to season three, but turned down the offer due to being recently divorced.

Also being introduced during this season are recurring cast members, described as "friends of the housewives." Jennifer Gilbert is the first ever recurring cast member in The Real Housewives franchise. Gilbert is an entrepreneur and the creative force behind her New York City event-planning company Save The Date. and is described as a survivor after surviving a vicious stabbing, being stabbed 37 times. Gilbert entered the series after being commissioned by Jill Zarin to help her with her party.

Zarin begins the season with a shift in her friendships, as she bonds with Ramona Singer but her and Bethenny haven't spoken in months. Zarin takes comfort in bonding with Singer, LuAnn de Lesseps and Kelly Bensimon about their issues with Frankel. Zarin and Frankel come face to face after the downfall of their friendship at the Jill Stuart fashion show. The newfound feud between the two worsens when Frankel reads an article about the two's friendship and she thinks Zarin is responsible. Frankel attempts to reach out to Zarin via a phone call and surprises her with a face-to-face meeting, set up by Signer.
Zarin is left feeling she is better off without Frankel.
Away from her drama with Frankel, Zarin works on an upcoming book her and her sister have been working on titled Secrets of a Jewish Mother.
Frankel returns to Manhattan after spending the summer falling in love with Jason Hoppy. Later their relationship continues to move forward when Frankel learns that she is pregnant and the two get engaged. Frankel's pregnancy is leaked on Perez Hilton's gossip site which leaves Zarin calling people to find out more information. After she calls Frankel, Frankel informs Alex McCord to let Zarin know she is done with her. Frankel poses nude for PETA. Frankel and Singer get into a vicious, below-the-belt argument on the Brooklyn Bridge.
Singer finds herself in between her husband Mario and de Lessep's drama after a comment he makes. Singer decides to renew vows to Mario, and asks her daughter Avery to be the maid of honor. Singer renews her vows to Mario at the Pierre Hotel, with all the wives in attendance.
De Lesseps makes a snide comment to Frankel at the Mercedes Benz New York Fashion Week which causes Frankel to go into verbal attack mode. De Lesseps divorce from the Count finalizes and she has a new man in her life. De Lesseps enters the studio to work on recording a song, "Money Can't Buy You Class" which she later performs for the housewives at her release party.
McCord is offended when Zarin and de Lesseps make a comment about her children. McCord organizes Brooklyn fashion weekend and her, Bensimon and Singer walk the catwalk. McCord confronts Zarin with all guns blazing, and her boldness leaves everyone shocked. De Lesseps, Singer and Zarin's husband Bobby all encourage McCord to apologize.
Bensimon decided to pose for Playboy which isn't received well by her daughters. At the interview for the spread, Bensimon thinks she has found a potential new suitor. Bensimon calls a truce between herself and Frankel but on a trip away from the city to the Virgin Islands, Bensimon gets a bit obsessed about revisiting the past. Bensimon gets into several arguments with Frankel during the trip which leave some of the ladies questioning Bensimon's mental stability. Bensimon reaches out to Zarin in a phone call which provokes Zarin to come to the island. By the time Zarin arrives on the island, Bensimon has already left and the ladies aren't too happy with Zarin's uninvited entrance.
Morgan enters the scene offering to host de Lessep's charity event at her Upper East Side townhouse. Morgan looks into plastic surgery and after she consults her surgeon she then consults her psychic.

Episodes

References

External links

 

2010 American television seasons
New York City (season 3)